S/n, S/N or s/n may refer to:

 Signal-to-noise ratio, a measure in science and engineering 
 Screen name (computing), of a computer user
 Serial number, a unique identifier

See also
 SN (disambiguation)
 Signal-to-noise (disambiguation)